Vereker is a surname. Notable people with the surname include:

Charles Vereker, 2nd Viscount Gort (1768–1842), Irish soldier and politician
Colin Leopold Prendergast Vereker, 8th Viscount Gort (1916–1995), peer and Isle of Man politician
Foley Charles Prendergast Vereker (1850-1900), Royal Navy officer and hydrographic surveyor
 Hugh Vereker, secretive novelist in Henry James's The Figure in the Carpet (1896)
 Gordon Vereker (1889–1976), British diplomat
John Prendergast Vereker, 3rd Viscount Gort (1790–1865), peer and politician
John Gage Prendergast Vereker, 5th Viscount Gort (1849–1902), peer
John Standish Surtees Prendergast Vereker, 6th Viscount Gort (1886–1946), peer and senior British Army officer
John Michael Medlicott Vereker (born 1944), British civil servant and Governor of Bermuda
Julian Charles Prendergast Vereker (1945–2000), British designer of hi-fi audio equipment
Standish Robert Gage Prendergast Vereker, 7th Viscount Gort (1888–1975), peer
John James "Tommy" Vereker (1893–1974), American baseball player

See also
Vereker Monteith Hamilton (1856–1931), Scottish artist of military and historical works
Viscount Gort